The Ultimate Weapon is a 1936  science fiction novel by American writer John W. Campbell initially published under the title of Uncertainy as a series in  Amazing Stories in October and December editions in 1936.

Plot
Alien invaders escape their doomed home-planet of Mira and bring their starship fleet to conquer Earth. Nothing stands in the way of the Miran invaders, except Buck Kendall, who has discovered the ultimate weapon that is Earth's last hope.

References

External links
 
Vintage45

1966 American novels
1966 science fiction novels
Alien invasions in novels
American science fiction novels
English-language novels
Works originally published in Amazing Stories